Henry Anthony may refer to:
 Henry B. Anthony (1815–1884), US newspaperman and politician
 Henry Anthony (cricketer) (1873–?), English cricketer
 Henry Mark Anthony (1817–1886), English landscape artist
 Henry T. Anthony (1814–1884), American photographer

See also

Anthony Henry (disambiguation)